Revolution Pro Wrestling (RevPro/RPW) is a British professional wrestling promotion founded on 26 August 2012 by Andy Quildan after separating from International Pro Wrestling: United Kingdom.

Revolution Pro Wrestling currently has partnerships with several internationally based promotions including US-based All Elite Wrestling (AEW), Japan's New Japan Pro-Wrestling (NJPW) and Mexico's Consejo Mundial de Lucha Libre (CMLL). American independent company Global Force Wrestling (GFW), also has worked with RPW in the past.

Top international wrestlers who have worked for RevPro, include WWE performers Kurt Angle, AJ Styles, Rey Mysterio, Kevin Owens, Apollo Crews, Finn Bálor, Karl Anderson, Luke Gallows, Kalisto, Sami Zayn, Shinsuke Nakamura, Killian Dain, Noam Dar, Tommaso Ciampa, and Adam Cole.

History
On 26 August 2012, at Summer Sizzler International Pro Wrestling: United Kingdom's (IPW:UK) booker Andy Quildan broke with the company to ensure the high standards he set to the promotion would be maintained. Quildan would bring with him the British Heavyweight, Tag Team and Cruiserweight Championships to the promotion. RPW would also book talent from other promotions such as Prince Devitt, Big Damo and Noam Dar, whom later were signed by WWE. With the rising popularity of RPW, it would become one of the biggest promotions in the British independent circuit.

RPW would begin a series of international collaborations and partnerships with other promotions. On 25 July 2014, RPW announced a working agreement with Global Force Wrestling (GFW). On 5 April 2015, RPW hosted hosted the first independent UK defence of the ICW World Heavyweight Championship as part of the At Our Best card when Drew Galloway defended the ICW title along with the EVOLVE and DGUSA Open the Freedom Gate Championships against Doug Williams.

On 18 July 2015, RPW established a working agreement with New Japan Pro-Wrestling as part of their "New IWGP Conception", a global expansion strategy centered on their international partnerships. The agreement also led to NJPW wrestlers making regular appearances for the promotion.

In May, RPW hosted a qualifying match for the WWE Cruiserweight Classic. The first co-promoted shows with NJPW were Uprising and Global Wars UK, which took place in October 2015. On 3 March 2016 RPW released their own OTT streaming service the RPW On Demand. On 16 March, announced a working agreement with Pro-Wrestling: EVE, which would also feature various title defenses of the Pro-Wrestling:EVE Championship and Pro-Wrestling:EVE events airing on the demand for the RPW On Demand. On 23 March, RPW launched a YouTube series the RevPro TV, which airs on Mondays.

On 8 June 2017, RPW announced the British J-Cup, a tournament based on NJPW's Super J-Cup for cruiserweight wrestlers from all over the world. In August 2017, RPW partnered with American promotion Ring of Honor (ROH) and Mexican Consejo Mundial de Lucha Libre (CMLL) for the War of the Worlds UK, which featured participation from the promotion. On 22 September, RPW announced that content from Over The Top Wrestling would also be available on RPW On Demand.

On 13 November, RPW announced the creation of its fourth active title the British Women's Championship, On 30 November, RPW reach a deal with NJPW to officially sell their merchandise from the RPW shop, becoming their second European carrier of their licensed merchandise. On 30 August 2018, RPW signed a television deal with FreeSports, where it premiered on Wednesday and Thursday, 5 and 6 September 2018, in a live special held at the York Hall in London, England. On 3 October, it was announced the Queen of the Ring tournament for their women's division. On 18 September 2019, RevPro announced they take over Southside Wrestling operations.

Training
Revolution Pro Wrestling hosts a professional wrestling school in Portsmouth, England. It was founded in August 2012 and run by Andy Quildan and Andy Simmonz. The school runs 4 trainee level shows a year for them to showcase their ability in front of a live audience. They teach all the basic elements of professional wrestling as well as other vital parts of being a wrestler such as how to conduct on social media.

Championships

Current champions

Former champions

Southside Heavyweight Championship

The Southside Heavyweight Championship was a professional wrestling championship created and promoted by the British professional wrestling promotion Progress Wrestling. The title was previously patroned by the Southside Wrestling Entertainment promotion from 2010 until its closure in 2019. There have been a total of 22 reigns and two vacancies shared between 19 distinctive champions. The last holder was Ricky Knight Jr.

Combined reigns 
{| class="wikitable sortable" style="text-align: center"
!Rank
!Wrestler
!No. ofreigns
!Combineddays
|-
!1
| Joseph Conners || 3 || 586
|-
!2
| Mark Haskins || 1 || 490
|-
!3
| Val Kabious || 1 || 335
|-
!4
| Ethan Page || 1 || 246
|-
!5
| Rob Lynch || 1 || 245
|-
!6
| Stixx || 2 || 223
|-
!7
| Max Angelus || 1 || 212
|-
!8
| T-Bone || 1 || 203
|-
!9
| El Ligero || 1 || 189
|-
!10
| BT Gunn || 1 || 175
|-
!11
| Shigehiro Irie || 1 || 161
|-
!12
| David Starr || 1 || 160
|-
!13
| Sean Kustom || 1 || 152
|-
!14
| Rene Dupree || 1 || 84
|-
!15
| Greg Burridge || 1 || 43
|-
!16
| Rockstar Spud || 1 || 32
|-
!17
| Ricky Knight Jr. || 1 || 14
|-
!rowspan=2|18
| Dan Moloney || 1 || <1
|-
|Robbie X || 1 || <1
|-

Events

Marquee events
High Stakes
Summer Sizzler
Uprising

Collaborated events
Strong Style Evolved UK (with NJPW)

Tournaments

Notable alumni

A. C. H.
Addy Starr
AJ Styles
Adam Cole
Aiden Taylor
Alberto El Patrón
Alex Koslov
Alex Windsor
Andrew Everett
Andy Boy Simmonz 
Andy Steel
Angélico
Ashley Kay
Austin Aries
Bad Luck Fale
Bea Priestley
Big van Walter
Big Damo
Bram
Brandi Rhodes
Brodus Clay
Bubblegum
Bully Ray
Bushi
Cara Noir (fka Tom Dawkins)
Carlito
Chardonnay
Chris Brookes
Chris Hero
Christopher Daniels
Chuck Cyrus
Chuck Mambo
Chuck Taylor
Cody Rhodes
Colt Cabana
Crusher Curtis
Connor Mills
Dahlia Black
Dalton Castle
Dan Magee
Dan Moloney
Dan Head
Dave Mastiff
"British Bulldog" Davey Boy Smith Jr.
Davey Richards
David Starr
Dean Allmark
Debbie Keitel
Doc Gallows
Doug Williams
Donovan Dijak
Drew Galloway
Eddie Dennis
Eddie Edwards
El Generico
El Ligero
El Phantasmo
Evil
Fit Finlay
Fearless Flatliner
Frankie Kazarian
Gedo
Grado
Grand Master Sexay
Hanson
Harry Milligan
Hiromu Takahashi
Hirooki Goto
Hiroshi Tanahashi
Hiroyoshi Tenzan
Hornswoggle
Jack Swagger
Jake McCluskey
James Castle
James Davis
James Tighe
Jamie Hayter
Jay Lethal
Jay Sammon
Jay White
JD Knight
Jeff Cobb
Jerry Lynn
Jim Hunter
Jimmy Havoc
Jinny (Couture)
Jody Fleisch
Joel Masters
Joel Redman
John Morrison
Jonny Storm
Josh Bodom
Josh Wall / Kelly Sixx
Jordan Devlin
Jyushin Thunder Liger
Juventud Guerrera
Karl Anderson
Karsten Beck
Katsuyori Shibata
Kazuchika Okada
Kenbai
Kenny Omega
Kevin Steen
Kid Lykos
Kris Travis
Kurt Angle
Kurtis Chapman
Kushida
Kyle Fletcher
Kyle O'Reilly
Lee Hunter
Lion Kid 
Lio Rush
Lord Gideon Grey
Luke Phoenix
Mark Andrews
Mark Davis
Mark Haskins
Martin Kirby
Martin Stone
"Session Moth" Martina
Marty Scurll
Matt Cross
Matt Jackson
Matt Nathan
Matt Sydal
Matt Taven
Max Voltage
Michael Elgin
Michael Oku
"Speedball" Mike Bailey
Mike Bennett
Mike Hitchman/Wild Boar
Mikey Whiplash
Millie McKenzie
MK McKinnan
Morgan Webster
Magnus
Nick Jackson
Nina Samuels
No Funne Dunne
Noam Dar
Oliver Carter
Pac
Paul Robinson
Patrick Sammon
Pete Dunne
PJ Black
Prince Devitt
Rampage Brown
Raymond Rowe
Rhia O'Reilly
Ricochet
Rich Swann
Rishi Ghosh
Rikishi
RJ Singh
Rob "The Gob" Lias
Rob Lynch
Robbie Dynamite
Robbie X
Rocky Romero
Rockstar Spud
Roderick Strong
Roy Knight
Ryan Smile
Ryan Bodom
Ryback
Samuray Del Sol
Sami Callihan
Sanada
Senza Volto
Satoshi Kojima
Scotty 2 Hotty
Sha Samuels
Shanna
Shane Strickland
Shaun Jackson
Shelton Benjamin
Shinsuke Nakamura
Sierra Loxton
Sonjay Dutt
Stixx
Tajiri
T-Bone
Taya Valkyrie
Terry Frazier
Tessa Blanchard
Tetsuya Naito
Timothy Thatcher
Tiger Ali
TK Cooper
Tommaso Ciampa
Tommy End
Tomoaki Honma
Tomohiro Ishii
Toni Storm
Travis Banks
Trent Seven
Trevor Lee
Tyler Bate
Uhaa Nation
Último Dragón
Vader
Veda Scott
Will Castle 
Will Ospreay
X-Pac
Xia Brookside
Yoshi-Hashi
Yuji Nagata
Yuu
Zack Gibson
Zack Sabre Jr.
Zak Knight
Zan Phoenix
Zoe Lucas

See also
Professional wrestling in the United Kingdom
Professional wrestling promotions in the United Kingdom

References

External links

 
International Pro Wrestling: United Kingdom
British professional wrestling promotions
2012 establishments in England